Alessandro Minelli (born 28 November 1970) is a retired Swiss football defender.

References

1970 births
Living people
Swiss men's footballers
FC Chiasso players
FC Luzern players
FC Locarno players
Association football defenders